The Kureinji, otherwise known as the Keramin, are an Aboriginal group whose traditional lands are located in southwest New South Wales, Australia, along the north side of the Murray River roughly between today's settlements of Euston and Wentworth.

Language
Kureinji was one of 35 languages spoken in this area of southwestern New South Wales, around and north of the border with Victoria. Linguistically the tribe was part of the Lower Murray Areal group, and with Yitayita and Dadi Dadi forms a distinct subfamily.

Country

Across the river from the Kureinji, Mildura, which is in Latjilatji tribal land, was first settled by Europeans in 1847.

Kemendok National Park is part of their traditional land, and traces of their habitation remains in scar trees, fire hearths, flaked stone artefacts, burial sites and middens.

History
Charles Sturt passed through their country in 1830 but did not mention the Kureinji, Charles Lockhart in 1862 also appears to mention, without however actually specifying this tribe. Many of the Kureinji today live in Mildura.

During colonial times, bodies were taken from five burial sites along the New South Wales side of the Murray River, and are now part of the Murray Black Collection.  Tribal groups have been seeking the repatriation of these bodies.

Alternative names

 Garnghes
 Grangema
 Jungeegatchere
 Kareingi Karin Kemendok Keramin Kerinma, Karinma, Karingma Kianigane Kinenekinene Orangema (misprint).
 Pintwa''

Source:

Notes

Citations

Sources

Aboriginal peoples of New South Wales